Pompeo Ciotti (Pistoia, 1858-1915) was an Italian freemason and political activist.

In 1898 he was sentenced to four years and two months in prison for the crime of incitement to violent overthrow of the constitution.

He served as secretary of the was secretary of the Pavia Chamber of Labour and later of the Italian Socialist Party (PSI).

In 1912 he was elected secretary of the breakaway Italian Reformist Socialist Party, established after the expulsion from the PSI of those members who did not support its position opposing the Italian invasion of Libya.

Works
Ciotti left a number published works:

Agguati Della Consorteria, Maggio 1898. Cinque anni doppo (1903)
Maggio Sanguiniso. Bozzetti di Firenze
Sindicalismo Italico. Dalle Origini all’Insurrezzione (1906)

References

1858 births
1915 deaths
People from Pistoia
Italian socialists